Eusebio Bejarano Vilaro (born 6 May 1948 in Badajoz, Spain) is a former Spanish footballer.

He played for Atlético de Madrid between 1968 and 1979, winning the Spanish League in 1970, 1973, and 1976, the Spanish Cup in 1972 and 1976, and the Intercontinental Cup in 1975. He played in the 1974 European Cup Final, which Atlético lost.

Honors

Atlético Madrid:
Intercontinental Cup: 1974
Spanish League: 1969–70, 1972–73, 1976–77
Spanish Cup: 1971–72, 1975–76

External links
 

1948 births
Living people
Spanish footballers
La Liga players
Association football defenders
CD Badajoz players
Atlético Madrid footballers
Spain under-23 international footballers